Pelochrista infidana is a moth belonging to the family Tortricidae. The species was first described by Jacob Hübner in 1824.

It is native to Europe.

References

Eucosmini